Henri René Pierre Villat (24 December 1879 – 19 March 1972) was a French mathematician. He was professor of fluid mechanics at the University of Paris from 1927 until his death. Villat became a member of the French Academy of Sciences in 1932, and its president in 1948.

References

External links

1879 births
1972 deaths
French mathematicians
University of Montpellier alumni
Academic staff of the University of Paris
Fluid dynamicists
Members of the French Academy of Sciences